Porvoon Salibandyseura (PSS) is a Finnish sports club specialized on floorball. It was founded in 2003 when sports clubs Gammelbackan Terä, SaFa and Porvoon Butchers were joined. Women play in nations highest league Naisten Salibandyliiga and men play in the I-division. The club has also boys teams from age groups A to G and girls teams from A to F. In 2008, PSS had 35 teams.

Women on season 2008-09

References

External links 

 Homepage of the club
 Women's team card in Salibandyliiga

Finnish floorball teams
Sport in Porvoo
2003 establishments in Finland